EHHS may refer to

Eagle Harbor High School
East Hall High School
East Hardy High School
East Haven High School
East Hollywood High School
Eastern Hills High School
Eastern Hancock High School
Engineering Heritage Hallmark Scheme